Clarence William Nelson II (born September 29, 1942) is an American politician and attorney serving as the administrator of the National Aeronautics and Space Administration (NASA). Nelson previously served as a United States Senator from Florida from 2001 to 2019. A member of the Democratic Party, he previously served in the Florida House of Representatives from 1972 to 1978 and in the United States House of Representatives from 1979 to 1991. In January 1986, Nelson became the second sitting member of U.S. Congress to fly in space, after Senator Jake Garn, when he served as a payload specialist on mission STS-61-C aboard the Space Shuttle Columbia. Before entering politics he served in the U.S. Army Reserve during the Vietnam War. As of 2022, Nelson remains the last Democrat to have served as a United States Senator from Florida.

Nelson retired from Congress in 1990 to run for governor of Florida, but was unsuccessful. He was later elected Treasurer, Insurance Commissioner and Fire Marshal of Florida, serving from 1995 to 2001. In 2000, Nelson was elected to the U.S. Senate seat that had been vacated by retiring Republican Senator Connie Mack III with 51% of the vote. He was reelected in 2006 with 60% of the vote and in 2012 with 55% of the vote. Nelson ran in 2018 for a fourth term, but was narrowly defeated in the general election by then-Governor Rick Scott. In May 2019, Nelson was appointed to serve on NASA's advisory council.

In the U.S. Senate, Nelson was generally considered a centrist and a moderate Democrat. Nelson supported same-sex marriage, lowering taxes on lower and middle income families, expanding environmental programs and regulation, protecting the Affordable Care Act, and expanding Medicaid. Nelson chaired the Senate Aging Committee from 2013 to 2015, and served as ranking member of the Senate Commerce Committee from 2015 to 2019.

On March 19, 2021, President Joe Biden announced his intention to nominate Nelson to the position of NASA administrator. Nelson was confirmed by unanimous consent by the Senate on April 29, 2021, and was sworn in by vice president Kamala Harris on May 3, 2021.

Early life and education
Nelson was born on September 29, 1942, in Miami, Florida, the only child of Nannie Merle and Clarence William Nelson. His father was a real estate investor and a lawyer. He is of Scottish, Irish, English, and Danish descent. His father died of a heart attack when Nelson was 14 and his mother of Lou Gehrig's disease (ALS) when he was 24.
Nelson grew up in Melbourne, Florida, where he attended Melbourne High School.

He attended Baptist and Episcopal churches but later was baptized through immersion in a Baptist church. He served as International President of Kiwanis-sponsored Key Club International (1959–1960). In 2005, he joined the First Presbyterian Church in Orlando.

Nelson attended the University of Florida, where he was a member of Florida Blue Key and Beta Theta Pi social fraternity. He transferred to Yale University after two years at the University of Florida. At Yale he would be roommates with Bruce Smathers, the son of Florida Senator George Smathers. Nelson received a Bachelor of Arts with a major in political science from Yale University in 1965 and a Juris Doctor from the University of Virginia in 1968.

In 1965, during the Vietnam War, he joined the United States Army Reserve. He served on active duty from 1968 to 1970, attaining the rank of captain, and he remained in the Army until 1971. Nelson was admitted to the Florida bar in 1968, and began practicing law in Melbourne in 1970. In 1971, he worked as legislative assistant to Governor Reubin Askew.

Space Shuttle Columbia
In 1986, Nelson became the second sitting member of Congress (and the first member of the House) to travel into space. He went through NASA training with Senator Jake Garn of Utah. Nelson was a Payload Specialist on 's STS-61-C mission from January 12 to 18, 1986. This mission was the last successful Space Shuttle flight prior to the Challenger accident, which occurred ten days after the end of this mission. In 1988, Nelson published a book about his space flight experience entitled Mission: An American Congressman's Voyage to Space.

Early political career

Florida Legislature

In 1972, Nelson was elected to the Florida House of Representatives as the member from the 47th district, representing much of Brevard County and portions of Orange County and Seminole County. He won reelection in 1974 and 1976.

U.S. House of Representatives
Nelson was elected to the U.S. House of Representatives in 1978 in the open 9th congressional district after the five-term Republican incumbent, Louis Frey Jr., chose to run for governor of Florida rather than for reelection.

In 1980, Nelson was reelected to that district, which encompassed all of Brevard and part of Orange County. He was redistricted to the 11th congressional district, encompassing all of Brevard and parts of Orange, Indian River, and Osceola counties; he won reelection in 1982, 1984, 1986, and 1988. He remained a member of the U.S. House of Representatives until 1991.

Nelson chaired the House Space Subcommittee for six years as a key member of the House Committee on Science, Space and Technology. His district included Cape Canaveral and its space facility. In 1988, Bill Nelson criticized President Reagan's policy to export American satellites for launch on China's Long March rockets. Nelson called this an "inconsistent administration policy." Nelson stated that Reagan "wanted to build up commercial space ventures, and on the other hand, he is cutting off the commercial space ventures at the knees with these export licenses."

1990 gubernatorial election
In 1990, Nelson ran unsuccessfully for the Democratic nomination for governor of Florida. His primary rival was former U.S. Senator Lawton Chiles. During the campaign, the younger Nelson tried to highlight Chiles' age and use of Prozac to treat his depression, but this proved to be an unpopular strategy, and Nelson lost by a wide margin, getting 30.5% of the vote to Chiles' 69.5%. Chiles went on to win the general election.

Treasurer, Insurance Commissioner and Fire Marshal

In 1994, Nelson announced his intention to seek the office of Treasurer, Insurance Commissioner and Fire Marshal of Florida. He won the election with 52% of the vote over State Rep. Tim Ireland's 48%. In 1998, he won re-election to the office, again defeating Ireland.

In 2000, Nelson announced that he would be running for the United States Senate seat held by retiring Republican Connie Mack III. Florida's resign-to-run law compelled Nelson to submit his resignation as Treasurer, Insurance Commissioner and Fire Marshal early in 2000 when he began to campaign for the U.S. Senate seat. He chose January 3, 2001, as the effective date of his resignation, as that was the date on which new Senators would be sworn in.

United States Senate

Elections

2000 

In 2000, Nelson ran as a Democrat for the U.S. Senate seat vacated by retiring Republican Senator Connie Mack III. He won the election, defeating U.S. Representative Bill McCollum, who ran as the Republican candidate.

2006 

Following the 2004 election, in which Republican George W. Bush was re-elected and the Republican Party increased its majority in both the House and the Senate, Nelson was seen as vulnerable. He was a Democrat in a state that Bush had won, though by a margin of only five percentage points.

Evangelical Christian activist James Dobson declared that Democrats, including Nelson, would be "in the 'bull's-eye'" if they supported efforts to block Bush's judicial nominees. Nelson's refusal to support efforts in Congress to intervene in the Terri Schiavo case was seen as "a great political issue" for a Republican opponent to use in mobilizing Christian conservatives against him.

Katherine Harris, the former Florida Secretary of State and two-term U.S. representative, defeated three other candidates in the September 5 Republican primary. Harris's role in the 2000 presidential election made her a polarizing figure. Many Florida Republicans were eager to reward her for her perceived party loyalty in the Bush-Gore election, while many Florida Democrats were eager to vote against her for the same reason. In May, when the party found itself unable to recruit a candidate who could defeat Harris in the primary, many Republican activists admitted that the race was already lost.

Nelson focused on safe issues, portraying himself as a bipartisan centrist problem-solver.
He obtained the endorsement of all 22 of Florida's daily newspapers. Harris failed to secure the endorsement of Jeb Bush, who publicly stated that she could not win; the U.S. Chamber of Commerce, which had supported her in her House campaigns, did not endorse her in this race.

As the election approached, polls showed Harris trailing Nelson by 26 to 35 points. Nelson transferred about $16.5 million in campaign funds to other Democratic candidates, and won the election with 2,890,548 votes to Harris's  1,826,127 votes. He won 57 out of the state's 67 counties.

2012 

Vice President Joe Biden called Nelson crucial to President Obama's chances for winning Florida in 2012. In March 2011, Biden was reported as having said that if Nelson lost in 2012, "it means President Obama and the Democratic presidential ticket won't win the key battleground state, either." Congressman Connie Mack IV, the son of Nelson's direct predecessor in the Senate, won the Republican nomination. Nelson eventually defeated Mack with 55.2% of the vote to Mack's 42.2%.

2018 

Nelson ran for re-election in 2018. He ran unopposed in the Democratic Party primary, which took place on August 28, 2018. He faced incumbent Florida Governor Rick Scott (a Republican) in the general election on November 6, 2018. The extremely tight race—with a margin of less than 0.25% separating Nelson and Scott—triggered a manual recount as mandated by state law. A recount showed that Scott had defeated Nelson by 10,033 votes.

A paper by scholars at the MIT Election Data and Science Lab concluded that the design of Broward County's 2018 general election ballots may have resulted in Nelson receiving 9,658 fewer votes than he otherwise would have received (which would have narrowed Scott's margin of victory but not changed the result of the election). The study found that many voters did not see the U.S. Senate race on the lower left side of the ballot and, as a result, did not cast votes in that race.

Committee assignments
In the 113th United States Congress, Nelson served on the following committees:
Committee on Armed Services
Subcommittee on Airland
Subcommittee on Emerging Threats and Capabilities
Subcommittee on Seapower
Committee on the Budget
Committee on Commerce, Science, and Transportation
Subcommittee on Aviation Operations, Safety, and Security
Subcommittee on Oceans, Atmosphere, Fisheries, and Coast Guard
Subcommittee on Science and Space (Chairman)
Committee on Finance
Subcommittee on Health Care
Subcommittee on Energy, Natural Resources, and Infrastructure
Subcommittee on Social Security, Pensions, and Family Policy
Special Committee on Aging (Chairman)
In the 114th United States Congress, Nelson served on the following committees:
Committee on Commerce, Science and Transportation (Ranking Member)
Subcommittee on Aviation Operations, Safety, and Security
Subcommittee on Communications, Technology, Innovation, and the Internet
Subcommittee on Consumer Protection, Product Safety, Insurance and Data Security
Subcommittee on Oceans, Atmosphere, Fisheries, and Coast Guard
Subcommittee on Space, Science and Competitiveness
Subcommittee on Surface Transportation and Merchant Marine Infrastructure, Safety, and Security
Committee on Armed Services
Subcommittee on Emerging Threats and Capabilities (Ranking Member)
Subcommittee on Sea Power
Subcommittee on Strategic Forces
Committee on Finance
Subcommittee on Energy, Natural Resources, and Infrastructure
Subcommittee on International Trade, Customs, and Global Competitiveness
Subcommittee on Taxation and IRS Oversight
United States Senate Special Committee on Aging

Post-Senate activities
On May 28, 2019, Nelson was appointed to serve on NASA's advisory council. Nelson was a member-at-large of the council, which advises on all major program and policy issues before the agency. His appointment was praised by NASA administrator Jim Bridenstine, who stated that "Nelson is a true champion for human spaceflight and will add tremendous value as we go to the Moon and on to Mars."

Nelson endorsed former Vice President Joe Biden for President of the United States in 2020.

NASA administrator

Nomination
On February 22, 2021, reports emerged that President Biden was considering nominating Nelson to be the NASA Administrator, then, on March 18, 2021, it was reported that Biden had selected Nelson for the position, with Biden officially announcing the decision the next day. Nelson's nomination received widespread support from members of Congress from both parties, including from Nelson's former opponent and successor in the senate Rick Scott, as well as the overall space industry. The United States Senate in unanimous consent voted to confirm Nelson to be NASA Administrator on April 29, 2021. Nelson was sworn in on May 3, 2021, by Vice President Kamala Harris.

Political positions
Nelson was often considered to be a moderate Democrat. He has styled himself as a centrist during his various campaigns. During Nelson's 2018 re-election campaign, challenger Rick Scott characterized Nelson as a "socialist"; PolitiFact described the assertion as "pants-on-fire" false. According to ratings by the National Journal, Nelson was given a 2013 composite score of 21% conservative and 80% liberal. In 2011, he was given composite scores of 37% conservative and 64% liberal.

He has a lifetime conservative rating of nearly 30% from the American Conservative Union. Conversely, the Americans for Democratic Action gave Nelson a 90% liberal quotient for 2016. In the 115th Congress, Nelson was more conservative than 93% of other congressional Democrats. GovTrack, which analyzes a politician's record, places Nelson near the Senate's ideological center and GovTrack placed him among the most moderate Senators in 2017.

The only Florida Democrat in statewide office in 2017, he was described by Politico in March of that year as "a Senate indicator species...an institutional centrist." Politico wrote that the Democratic Party "is shifting left and so is he."

In July 2017, Nelson had a 53% approval rating and 25% disapproval rating, with 22% of survey respondents having no opinion on his job performance. FiveThirtyEight, which tracks Congressional votes, shows that Nelson had voted with President Donald Trump's positions 42.5% of the time .

Economic issues

Trade
In 2005, Nelson was one of ten Democrats who voted in favor of the Dominican Republic – Central America Free Trade Agreement (CAFTA) on its 55–45 passage in the Senate.

Tax policy
On several occasions, Nelson has voted to reduce or eliminate the estate tax, notably in June 2006, when he was one of four Democrats voting for a failed (57–41) cloture motion on a bill to eliminate the tax.

Nelson voted against a Republican plan to extend the Bush tax cuts to all taxpayers. Instead, Nelson supported extending the tax cuts for those with incomes below $250,000. Nelson voted for the Buffett Rule in April 2012. Speaking of his support for the Buffett Rule, Nelson said he voted to raise the minimum tax rate on incomes over $1 million per year to 30% in order to reduce the budget deficit and to make the tax code more fair. Nelson said, "In short, tax fairness for deficit reduction just makes common sense."

Nelson voted in 2011 to end Bush-era tax cuts for those earning over $250,000 but voted for $143 billion in tax cuts, unemployment benefits, and other economic measures.

In 2013, Nelson advocated tax reform, which he defined as "getting rid of special interest tax breaks and corporate subsidies." Stating needed qualities of said reform, he listed "simplicity, fairness, and economic growth".

He and Susan Collins introduced legislation in 2015 that would "make it easier for smaller businesses to cut administrative costs by forming multiple-employer 401(k)-style plans."

Government spending
Nelson voted for the American Recovery and Reinvestment Act of 2009, often referred to as economic stimulus, proposed by President Obama. In August 2011, Nelson voted for a bill to increase the debt ceiling by $400 billion. Nelson said that while the bill was not perfect, "this kind of gridlock doesn't do anything." Nelson voted against Paul Ryan's budget.

Consumer affairs
In May 2013, Nelson asked the Federal Trade Commission and the Consumer Financial Protection Bureau to investigate why consumers who carried out a real-estate short sale were having their credit scores lowered to the same degree as those who went through foreclosure. Nelson suggested a penalty if the issue was not addressed within ninety days.

Nelson was frequently interested in product safety issues, and as such was frequently engaged in oversight and criticism of the U.S. Consumer Product Safety Commission. For example, he repeatedly opposed President Donald Trump's nominee to lead the commission.

Flood insurance
Nelson voted in favor of the Biggert–Waters Flood Insurance Reform Act of 2012, which required the National Flood Insurance Program to raise insurance rates for some properties at high risk of flooding to better reflect true flood risk costs and keep the program solvent. In 2014, following an outcry by Florida property owners facing steep flood insurance-rate hikes, Nelson supported legislation that would provide retroactive refunds for taxpayers who had experienced large hikes in their flood-insurance rates due to the sale or purchase of a home. The proposal would also cap average annual premium increases at 15 to 18 percent and allow insurance-rates subsidies based on current flood maps.

Earmarks

In 2010, PolitiFact found that Nelson had flip-flopped on the issue of earmarks, pushing for a moratorium on the practice after saying that "earmarks were an important part of creating jobs and growing Florida's economy."

Terrorism
In September 2014, Nelson said the U.S. should hit back at ISIS immediately because "the U.S. is the only one that can put together a coalition to stop this group that's intent on barbaric cruelty."

He supported the "Denying Firearms and Explosives to Dangerous Terrorists Act." Introduced in 2013 and again in 2015, it would keep guns from people with suspected terrorist links.

Standing outside the Orlando Pulse nightclub immediately after the June 2016 massacre there, Nelson called Omar Mateen a "lone wolf," and when asked if it was an act of jihad he said he could not confirm that. Shortly afterwards, citing intelligence sources, Nelson said there was apparently "a link to Islamic radicalism," perhaps ISIS. Nelson later said on the Senate floor that "terrorists...want to divide people" but that Mateen had instead "brought people together. Following the massacre, Nelson and Barbara Mikulski supported an increase in FBI funding. A year after the Orlando massacre, Nelson attended a memorial at which he reiterated that it had "united Orlando and it united the country."

He supported the Terrorist Firearms Prevention Act of 2016.

In August 2017, the Miami Herald urged Nelson to back Lindsey Graham's Taylor Force Act, which would block U.S. subsidies to the Palestinian Authority, which gives monetary assistance to "Palestinian prisoners, former prisoners and families of 'martyrs.'" Nelson did vote for the bill, which passed overwhelmingly.

Health care

In March 2010, Nelson voted for the Patient Protection and Affordable Care Act, also known as Obamacare, and the Health Care and Education Reconciliation Act of 2010, which passed and were signed into law by President Obama.

Nelson called in 2014 for the expansion of Medicaid.

In 2016, he called the House Zika bill "a disaster," complaining that it would take "$500 million in health care funding away from Puerto Rico" and limit access to "birth control services needed to help curb the spread of the virus and prevent terrible birth defects." In 2017 Nelson wrote a letter to the Center for Disease Control and Prevention (CDC) asking them to prioritize Zika prevention.

In September 2017, Nelson and Susan Collins (R-ME) introduced the Reinsurance Act of 2017, an effort "to stabilize the health insurance marketplace." It would provide $2.25 billion to "reduce risk for insurance companies by providing funds to insurers for high-risk enrollees" and "help keep premiums in check."

Immigration
In January 2017, Nelson wrote President Trump a letter protesting his immigration order. "Regardless of the constitutionality or legality of this Executive Order," he wrote, "I am deeply concerned that it may do more harm than good in our fight to keep America safe." U.S. success in the fight against terrorism, he argued, "depends on the cooperation and assistance of Muslims who reject radicalism and violence. Whether intended or not, this Executive Order risks alienating the very people we rely upon in the fight against terror."

Space exploration and NASA

In March 2010, Nelson complained that President Obama had made a mistake in canceling NASA's Constellation program. He argued against the $6-billion Commercial Crew Development proposed by the presidential administration and for a NASA-developed heavy-lift rocket built on Constellation's inheritance (which was later included in the 2010 NASA Authorization Act and became SLS). 11 years later, Charles Bolden (NASA administrator in 2010) commented that Nelson's skepticism was common in Congress at the time and refused to call him an opponent of commercial crew.

On July 7, 2011, it was reported that Nelson said Congress "starved" the space program of funding for several years, but suggested that the situation was turning around and called on the Obama administration to push for NASA funding. In September 2011 Nelson, together with Republican Kay Hutchison, led the push to continue the development of Constellation's Ares V SLV in the form of Space Launch System.

In 2016, Sen. Nelson brokered a bipartisan compromise on ending import of Russian RD-180 rocket engines.

In 2017 and 2018, Nelson sought to prevent Jim Bridenstine, President Trump's nominee to head NASA, from being confirmed in the Senate. Bridenstine had no formal qualifications in science or engineering, and denied the scientific consensus on climate change. Bridenstine was ultimately confirmed.

During his own confirmation hearing in 2021, Nelson reversed his earlier stances on the Commercial Crew Program and desirability of a NASA administrator without STEM education, and praised Bridenstine (the latter endorsed him earlier).

In June 2021, Nelson told CNN Business' Rachel Crane about the future of U.S.-Russian cooperation in the International Space Station (ISS): "For decades, upwards now of 45 plus years [we've cooperated with] Russians in space, and I want that cooperation to continue. Your politics can be hitting heads on Earth, while you are cooperating" in space.

LGBT rights
On December 18, 2010, Nelson voted in favor of the Don't Ask, Don't Tell Repeal Act of 2010, which established a legal process for ending the policy that prevented gay and lesbian people from serving openly in the United States Armed Forces.

On April 4, 2013, Nelson announced that he no longer opposed same-sex marriage. He wrote, "The civil rights and responsibilities for one must pertain to all. Thus, to discriminate against one class and not another is wrong for me. Simply put, if The Lord made homosexuals as well as heterosexuals, why should I discriminate against their civil marriage? I shouldn't, and I won't."

Foreign policy

Iraq War 
Nelson voted for the Authorization for Use of Military Force Against Iraq Resolution of 2002 authorizing military action against Iraq.

Iran 
In July 2017, Nelson voted in favor of the Countering America's Adversaries Through Sanctions Act that placed sanctions on Iran together with Russia and North Korea.

Israel 
In September 2016, in advance of a UN Security Council resolution 2334 condemning Israeli settlements in the occupied Palestinian territories, Nelson signed an AIPAC-sponsored letter urging President Barack Obama to veto "one-sided" resolutions against Israel.

In March 2017, Nelson co-sponsored the Israel Anti-Boycott Act, Senate Bill 720, which permits U.S. states to enact laws that would require contractors to sign a pledge saying that they would not boycott any goods from Israel, or their contracts would be terminated

In December 2017, Nelson supported President Trump's decision to recognize Jerusalem as Israel's capital.

Venezuela 
In April 2017, Nelson called for tougher economic sanctions against Venezuela, which he called an "economic basket case."

Cuba 
He opposed a 2009 spending bill until his concerns about certain provisions in the bill related to Cuba were assuaged by Treasury Secretary Tim Geithner, who assured him that those provisions "would not amount to a major reversal of the decades-old U.S. policy of isolating the communist-run island."

Syria visit 
In 2006, Nelson met with Syrian President Bashar Assad in Damascus at the recommendation of the bipartisan Iraq Study Group to try to improve US-Syria relations and help stabilize Iraq. He did this despite the United States Department of State and the White House saying they disapproved of the trip.

Russia 
Following the destruction of Kosmos 1408 in an anti-satellite weapons test by Russia, Nelson stated that "With its long and storied history in human spaceflight, it is unthinkable that Russia would endanger not only the American and international partner astronauts on the ISS, but also their own cosmonauts", and the "actions are reckless and dangerous, threatening as well the Chinese space station".

Gun control

In 2012, the National Rifle Association (NRA) gave Nelson an "F" rating for his support of gun control. Nelson is an advocate for new gun control laws, including an assault weapons ban, a ban on magazines over ten rounds, and a proposal that would require individuals buying guns at gun shows to have background checks.

In response to the 2016 Orlando nightclub shooting, Nelson expressed remorse that the Democrats' Feinstein Amendment, which would have banned the sale of guns to individuals on the terrorist watch list, and a Republican proposal to update background checks and to create an alert for law enforcement when an individual is placed on the terrorist watch list, had failed to pass the Senate. He stated "What am I going to tell the community of Orlando that is trying to come together in the healing? Sadly, what I am going to have to tell them is that the NRA won again." Both he and Marco Rubio supported the bills.

In October 2017, after the Las Vegas shooting, Nelson and Dianne Feinstein sponsored a bill to ban bump stocks for assault weapons. "I'm a hunter and have owned guns my whole life," he said. "But these automatic weapons are not for hunting, they are for killing."

Nelson spread misinformation via Twitter after the Stoneman Douglas High School shooting, falsely claiming that shooter Nikolas Cruz wore a gas mask and tossed smoke grenades as he shot people. After an April 2018 shooting in Liberty City, Nelson claimed that assault weapons had been used in the shooting, when in fact handguns were used.

Student loans
In July 2017, Nelson introduced legislation to cut interest rates on student loans to 4 percent.

Environment
Nelson and Mel Martinez co-sponsored a 2006 bill banning oil drilling off Florida's Gulf Coast. In 2017 he said he wanted the ban to continue to 2027, but that it was "vigorously opposed by the oil industry." Along with 16 Florida congress members from both parties, he urged the Trump administration to keep the eastern Gulf of Mexico off limits to oil and gas drilling. "Drilling in this area," they wrote, "threatens Florida's multibillion-dollar tourism-driven economy and is incompatible with the military training and weapons testing that occurs there."

In 2011, Nelson co-sponsored the RESTORE Act, which directed money from BP fines to states affected by the Deepwater Horizon oil spill.

On June 27, 2013, Nelson co-sponsored the Harmful Algal Bloom and Hypoxia Research and Control Amendments Act of 2013 (S. 1254; 113th Congress), a bill that would reauthorize and modify the Harmful Algal Bloom and Hypoxia Research and Control Act of 1998 and would authorize the appropriation of $20.5 million annually through 2018 for the National Oceanic and Atmospheric Administration (NOAA) to mitigate the harmful effects of algal blooms and hypoxia.

In 2015, after Gov. Rick Scott directed Florida officials to stop using the terms "climate change" and "global warming," Nelson introduced an amendment to prevent federal agencies from censoring official communications on climate change. It "fell to a point of order after a 51-49 vote, though Senator Marco Rubio (R-FL) joined Nelson in supporting the amendment."

Hurricanes

After Hurricane Maria in 2017, Nelson and Marco Rubio agreed that Trump had taken too long to send the U.S. military to Puerto Rico to take part in relief efforts. "For one week we were slow at the switch," Nelson said in San Juan. "The most efficient organization in a time of disaster is an organization that is already capable of long supply lines in combat. And that's the U.S. military." After Hurricane Maria led many Puerto Ricans to flee to Florida, Nelson encouraged them to register to vote there.

Nelson was criticized for sending campaign fundraising emails in the wake of Hurricane Irma.

Supreme Court
Nelson opposed and filibustered the nomination of Neil Gorsuch for the Supreme Court.

Security and surveillance
In 2007, Nelson was the only Democrat on the Senate Intelligence Committee to vote against an amendment to withhold funds for the use by the CIA of torture on terrorism suspects. His vote, combined with those of all Republican members of the committee, killed the measure.

In January 2018, Nelson voted to reauthorize the Foreign Intelligence Surveillance Act, which allows the National Security Agency to extend a program of warrantless spying on internet and phone networks. In 2015, he had called for a permanent extension of the law.

Controversies

Campaign donations from Saudi Arabia
Nelson received campaign contributions from Saudi Arabia's lobbyists. In June 2017, Nelson voted to support Trump's $110 billion arms deal with Saudi Arabia. In March 2018, Nelson voted against Bernie Sanders' and Chris Murphy's bill to end U.S. support for the Saudi Arabian-led intervention in Yemen.

Russian hack claim
On August 7, 2018, Nelson claimed that Russian operatives had penetrated some of Florida's election systems ahead of the 2018 midterm elections; the claim was contentious during his 2018 re-election bid. He stated that more detailed information was classified. At the time, fact-checkers did not have evidence to backup Nelson's claims. However, later that August, "three people familiar with the intelligence" told NBC News "that there is a classified basis for Nelson's assertion", because "VR Systems had been penetrated in August 2016 by hackers working for" GRU.

A government official familiar with the intelligence told McClatchy that Russian hackers had penetrated some of Florida's county voting systems in 2016. DHS spokesperson Sarah Sendek said that the agency has "not seen any new compromises by Russian actors of election infrastructure." The Tampa Bay Times reported that Nelson had been told by leaders of the Senate Intelligence Committee of a penetration of some of Florida's voter registration databases in 2016.

Department of Homeland Security Secretary Kirstjen Nielsen and FBI director Christopher Wray denied Nelson's claims in a letter to Florida election officials. Amid the criticism, Nelson defended his assertions about Russian penetration, saying he and fellow Florida Senator Marco Rubio had been instructed by Mark Warner and Richard Burr, leaders of the Senate Intelligence Committee, to warn the Florida Secretary of State about Russian interference. Warner and Burr neither confirmed nor denied Nelson's claim that Florida's systems had been penetrated, while Rubio "has taken a line on the controversy similar to Burr and Warner's." The Foundation for Accountability and Civic Trust, a conservative watchdog group, filed an ethics complaint against Nelson, saying that he "discussed classified information or made it up."

Special Counsel Robert Mueller's investigation on Russian interference in the 2016 election, which concluded in April 2019, found that Russian intelligence officials "sent spearphishing emails to over 120 email accounts used by Florida county officials responsible for administering the 2016 U.S. election," and that "at least one Florida county" was successfully penetrated. In August 2018, federal authorities said they saw no signs of any "new or ongoing compromises" of state or local election systems. In May 2019, Governor Ron DeSantis said that voter databases in two counties had been successfully penetrated ahead of the 2016 presidential election.

Personal life 
In 1972, Nelson married Grace Cavert. The couple have two adult children: Charles William "Bill Jr." Nelson and Nan Ellen Nelson.

Electoral history

References

Further reading

External links

|-

|-

|-

|-

|-

|-

|-

|-

|-

1942 births
21st-century American politicians
Administrators of NASA
American astronaut-politicians
Episcopalians from Florida
American people of Danish descent
American people of English descent
American people of Irish descent
American people of Scottish descent
Democratic Party United States senators from Florida
Florida lawyers
Living people
Melbourne High School alumni
Democratic Party members of the Florida House of Representatives
Military personnel from Florida
People from Orlando, Florida
Politicians from Miami
Democratic Party members of the United States House of Representatives from Florida
State Treasurers of Florida
United States Army officers
University of Virginia School of Law alumni
Yale University alumni
Biden administration personnel
Space Shuttle program astronauts